Qaleh Timi (also Romanized as Qal‘eh Tīmī; also known as Qal‘eh Temī) is a village in Dorunak Rural District, Zeydun District, Behbahan County, Khuzestan Province, Iran. At the 2006 census, its population was 77, in 21 families.

References 

Populated places in Behbahan County